Miguel Ángel Sánchez (born 7 January 1943) is a former Costa Rican cyclist. He competed in the individual road race and the team time trial events at the 1968 Summer Olympics.

References

External links
 

1943 births
Living people
Costa Rican male cyclists
Olympic cyclists of Costa Rica
Cyclists at the 1968 Summer Olympics
Sportspeople from San José, Costa Rica